Sebhat-Leab Gebre-Egziabher (5 May 1936 – 20 February 2012) was an Ethiopian writer from Tigray Region. He is famous for pioneering the naturalist writing style in Amharic. His writing style was not constrained by the traditional Ethiopian writing style nor orthodox syntax. Despite using simple words and seemingly light prose, Sebhat's concepts are highly sophisticated and philosophical.

Biography

Sebhat was born on 5 May 1936 near the historical town of Adwa, Tigray in a village called Erba Gered. He is the brother of the scientist Tewolde Berhan Gebre Egziabher.

Sebhat originally intended to be a librarian. He visited Washington in 1960 and stayed there a year. At that time he was intending to write in English. He decided however that Amharic is better suited for his subject matter. He later visited France and received an award from UNESCO.

Sebhat published works of fiction and non fiction in French and Amharic. Some of his works have been translated into English. He also worked as a journalist and columnist for the Ethiopian Herald, Addis Zemen, Menen, and other magazines and newspapers.

Works

Amharic 
ሌቱም አይነጋልኝ Dawn Yet Not
ትኩሳት Tekusat (Fever), 1997 (romance)
ሰባተኛው መላክ Säbatägnaw Mälak (The 7th Angel), 1999 (romance)
እግረ፡ መንገድ ፩ እና ፪ Egrä Mängäd 1 enna 2 (Along the way 1 and 2), 2003
ማስታወሻ Mastawäsha (Notes), 2001
አምስት ስድስት ሰባት እና ሌሎችም ታሪኮች (Five, Six, Seven and Other Stories)
የፍቅር ሻማዎች (Love Candles)
ቦርጨቅ Borchek
ስምንተኛው ጋጋታ Semntegnaw Gagata(The Eighth Din)
ዛዚ Zazi
እነሆ ጀግና Eneho Jegna(Behold The Hero)
የትረካ ጥበብ Yetireka Tibeb(The Art Of Narration)

English 
Seeds and other stories, retold in English by Wendy Kindred. African Sun Publishing. Aventures, 2004 -

French 
Les Nuits d'Addis-Abeba, Paris, Actes Sud coll. Aventures, 2004 - , Translated by the author and Francis Falceto; Original title: ሌቱም፡ አይነጋልኝ, I will not see the end of the night, 2004.
"Letum Aynegalign

References

1936 births
2012 deaths
Ethiopian journalists
Ethiopian novelists
Ethiopian short story writers
20th-century novelists
21st-century novelists
People from Adwa
20th-century short story writers
21st-century short story writers
People from Tigray Region
Amharic-language writers